Lake Cassidy is a census-designated place (CDP) located in Snohomish County, Washington, United States. The population was 3,415 at the 2010 census.

Demographics
The population of Lake Cassidy was 3,415 at the 2010 Census. 1,880 people are male. 1,535 are female.

Geography
Lake Cassidy is located at coordinates  (48.066044, -122.082433). The elevation is 371 feet.

According to the United States Census Bureau, the CDP has a total area of 10.8 square miles (27.9 km²), of which, 10.6 square miles (27.4 km²) of it is land and 0.2 square miles (0.6 km²) of it (1.98%) is water.

References

Census-designated places in Snohomish County, Washington